The Kebaran culture, also known as the Early Near East Epipalaeolithic, was an archaeological culture in the Eastern Mediterranean area (c. 23,000 to 15,000 BP), named after its type site, Kebara Cave south of Haifa. The Kebaran were a highly mobile nomadic population, composed of hunters and gatherers in the Levant and Sinai areas who used microlithic tools.

Overview
The Kebaran is the last Upper Paleolithic phase of the Levant. Kebaran stone tool assemblages are characterized by small, geometric microliths, and are thought to have lacked the specialized grinders and pounders found in later Near Eastern cultures. Small stone tools called microliths and retouched bladelets can be found for the first time. The microliths of this culture period differ greatly from the Aurignacian artifacts.

The Kebaran is preceded by the Athlitian phase of the Upper Paleolithic Levantine Aurignacian (formerly called Antelian) and followed by the proto-agrarian Natufian culture of the Epipalaeolithic. The appearance of the Kebaran culture, of microlithic type implies a significant rupture in the cultural continuity of Levantine Upper Paleolithic.  The Kebaran culture, with its use of microliths, is associated with the use of the bow and arrow and the domestication of the dog.  The Kebaran is also characterised by the earliest collecting of wild cereals, known due to the uncovering of grain grinding tools. It was the first step towards the Neolithic Revolution. The Kebaran people are believed to have practiced dispersal to upland environments in the summer, and aggregation in caves and rockshelters near lowland lakes in the winter. This diversity of environments may be the reason for the variety of tools found in their kits.

Situated in the Terminal Pleistocene, the Kebaran is classified as an Epipalaeolithic society.  They are generally thought to have been ancestral to the later Natufian culture that occupied much of the same range, who advanced the use of wild grains, building on the Kebaran traits to acquire some symptoms of permanent settlements, agriculture, and hints of civilization.

Artistic expression

Evidence for symbolic behavior of Late Pleistocene foragers in the Levant has been found in engraved limestone plaquettes from the Epipaleolithic open-air site Ein Qashish South in the Jezreel Valley, Israel. The engravings were uncovered in Kebaran and Geometric Kebaran deposits (ca. 23,000 and ca. 16,500 BP), and include the image of a bird, the first figurative representation known so far from a pre-Natufian Epipaleolithic site, together with geometric motifs such as chevrons, cross-hatchings and ladders. Some of the engravings closely resemble roughly contemporary European finds, and may be interpreted as "systems of notations" or "artificial memory systems" related to the timing of seasonal resources and related important events for nomadic groups. 

Similar looking signs and patterns are well known from the context of the local Natufian, a final Epipaleolithic period when sedentary or semi-sedentary foragers started practicing agriculture.

The engravings found in Ein Qashish South involve symbolic conceptualization. They suggest that the figurative and non-figurative images comprise a coherent assemblage of symbols that might have been applied in order to store, share and transmit information related to the social activities and the subsistence of mobile bands. They also suggest a level of social complexity in pre-Natufian foragers in the Levant. The apparent similarity in graphics throughout the Late Pleistocene world and the mode of their application support the possibility that symbolic behavior has a common and much earlier origin.

Artifacts

References

Further reading
M. H. Alimen and M. J. Steve, Historia Universal siglo XXI. Prehistoria. Siglo XXI Editores, 1970 (reviewed and corrected in 1994) (original German edition, 1966, titled Vorgeschichte). 
University of Edinburgh, Archaeology 1 Lectures, "From Foraging to Farming", 2008 

 
Upper Paleolithic cultures of Asia
Archaeological cultures of the Near East
Ancient peoples of the Near East
Prehistory of the Middle East
Epipalaeolithic cultures